Wellington South is a former New Zealand parliamentary electorate. It existed for two periods between 1881 and 1946. It was represented by seven Members of Parliament.

Population centres
The previous electoral redistribution was undertaken in 1875 for the 1875–1876 election. In the six years since, New Zealand's European population had increased by 65%. In the 1881 electoral redistribution, the House of Representatives increased the number of European representatives to 91 (up from 84 since the 1875–76 election). The number of Māori electorates was held at four. The House further decided that electorates should not have more than one representative, which led to 35 new electorates being formed, including Wellington South, and two electorates that had previously been abolished to be recreated. This necessitated a major disruption to existing boundaries.

The electorate was in the southern suburbs of Wellington.

History
When Wellington South was abolished in 1887, Fisher transferred to Wellington East.

It was then re-created in 1908 and abolished in 1946. It was largely replaced by the  electorate, to which Robert McKeen transferred.

Election results
Wellington South was represented by seven Members of Parliament.

Key

Election results

1943 election

1935 election

1931 election

1928 election

1918 by-election

1914 election

1911 election

Notes

References

Historical electorates of New Zealand
Politics of the Wellington Region
1881 establishments in New Zealand
1908 establishments in New Zealand
1946 disestablishments in New Zealand
1887 disestablishments in New Zealand